The 1880 Men's tennis tour  was the fifth amateur tennis tour held that year. It now incorporated 41 tournaments staged in Australia, Great Britain and Ireland and the United States. The 1880 Wimbledon Championships was won by John Hartley against Herbert Lawford, in the Challenge Round.

The tour began in April Cheltenham, England and ended in October in Boston, Massachusetts, United States.

Calendar 
Notes 1: Challenge Round: the final round of a tournament, in which the winner of a single-elimination phase faces the previous year's champion, who plays only that one match. The challenge round was used in the early history of tennis (from 1877 through 1921), in some tournaments not all.* Indicates challenger
Notes 2:Tournaments in italics were events that were staged only once that season

Key

January to March 
No events

April

May

June

July

August

September

October

November

December 
No events

Notes

List of tournament winners 
Note: Important tournaments in bold

  Richard Sears—Boston—(1)
  Francis Benson—Bournemouth—(1)
  Ernest Renshaw—Cheltenham—(1)
  William Renshaw—Brighton, Irish Championships—(2)
  Dale Womersley—Eastbourne—(1)
  James Patten McDougall—Edinburgh—(1)
  A.Jennings-Kempton-(1)
  Champion Branfill Russell—Leicester—(1)
  Edward Bennett—Limerick—(1)
  Herbert Lawford—Princes Club—(1)
  Richard Taswell Richardson—Northern Championships—(1)
  Joseph Rainsford-Naas—(1)
  Joseph Gardner-Stafford—(1)
  Otway E. Woodhouse—Championship of America—(1)
  Ernest Maconchy—Torquay—(1)
  Vere St. Leger Goold—Waterford—(1)
  John Hartley—Wimbledon—(1)
  Frank Highett-Melbourne—(1)

Rankings 
Source: The Concise History of Tennis

See also 
 1880 Tennis Season
 1880 in sports

Notes

References

Sources 
 A Social History of Tennis in Britain: Lake, Robert J. (2014), Volume 5 of Routledge Research in Sports History. Routledge, UK, .
 Ayre's Lawn Tennis Almanack And Tournament Guide, 1908 to 1938, A. Wallis Myers.
 British Lawn Tennis and Squash Magazine, 1948 to 1967, British Lawn Tennis Ltd, UK.
 Dunlop Lawn Tennis Almanack And Tournament Guide, G.P. Hughes, 1939 to 1958, Dunlop Sports Co. Ltd, UK
 Fein, Paul (2003). Tennis confidential : today's greatest players, matches, and controversies. Washington, D.C.: Potomac Books. ISBN 978-1574885262.
 Lawn tennis and Badminton Magazine, 1906 to 1973, UK.
 Lowe's Lawn Tennis Annuals and Compendia, Lowe, Sir F. Gordon, Eyre & Spottiswoode
 Spalding's Lawn Tennis Annuals from 1885 to 1922, American Sports Pub. Co, USA.
 Sports Around the World: History, Culture, and Practice, Nauright John and Parrish Charles, (2012), ABC-CLIO, Santa Barbara, Cal, USA, .
 The Concise History of Tennis, Mazak Karoly, (2010), 6th Edition, 2015.
 Tennis; A Cultural History, Gillmeister Heiner, (1997), Leicester University Press, Leicester, UK.
 The Tennis Book, edited by Michael Bartlett and Bob Gillen, Arbor House, New York, 1981 
 The World of Tennis Annuals, Barrett John, 1970 to 2001.
 Total Tennis:The Ultimate Tennis Encyclopedia, by Bud Collins, Sport Classic Books, Toronto, Canada, 
 Wright & Ditson Officially Adopted Lawn Tennis Guide's 1890 to 1920 Wright & Ditsons Publishers, Boston, Mass, USA.
 http://www.tennisarchives.com/
 https://thetennisbase.com/

External links 
 http://www.tennisarchives.com/
 https://thetennisbase.com/1880 Season

Pre Open era tennis seasons
1880 Men's Tennis season